Anjelika may refer to:

 Anjelika Krylova, Russian figure skater
 Anjelika Akbar, music designer

See also 
 Anjelica (disambiguation)
 Angelika (disambiguation)
 Angelica (disambiguation)